Sacred Heart Catholic Academy is a Roman Catholic secondary school and sixth form located in Crosby, Merseyside, England. It was created from the amalgamation of Seafield Convent Grammar and St Bede's Secondary Modern in 1977, and was previously known as Sacred Heart Catholic High School and Sacred Heart Catholic College.

History
The school was founded from the amalgamation of Seafield Convent Grammar and St Bede's Secondary Modern in 1977, despite the differences of opinions from parents and governors on the merger proposals . The Crosby Catholic Parents for Comprehensive Education supported the plans, noting it was "exactly what they had proposed" several years prior in 1973, although others considered the proposals as "hasty", particularly as the provision for single-sex education was being removed.

It accepts boys and girls, primarily from its Catholic feeder primary schools including St. Edmund's and St. Thomas' Catholic Primary and Nursery School, Great Crosby Catholic Primary School and Ursuline Catholic Primary School.

The school is currently split across two sites. The Upper Site (which primarily deals with Year 9, Year 10, Year 11 and A-level students) is the former Seafield Convent building, whilst the lower site (which primarily deals with Year 7 and Year 8 students), situated on Myers Road East is the former St Bede's. The sites are within a short walk of each other.  The school's Upper Site was used as a setting for the film Nowhere Boy.

Previously a voluntary aided school administered by Sefton Council, in July 2022 Sacred Heart Catholic College converted to academy status. The school is now sponsored by the Pope Francis Multi Academy Trust. the school continues to be under the jurisdiction of the Roman Catholic Archdiocese of Liverpool.

Notable former pupils

Seafield Convent 
Cherie Blair QC, wife of former British Prime Minister Tony Blair

St Bede's Secondary Modern 
Kenny Everett, comedian

Sacred Heart Catholic High School/College 
Brian Dooley, comedian, television writer
Victor Anichebe, professional football player
Chris Doyle, professional football player
Adam Hammill, professional football player
Marcus Collins, singer & X Factor finalist
Daniel Purvis, Team GB gymnast
Iffy Onuora, professional football player
Jordan Ramos, sprinter, gymnast
Rosa Mannion, operatic soprano

References

External links
School Website

Catholic secondary schools in the Archdiocese of Liverpool
Secondary schools in the Metropolitan Borough of Sefton
Academies in the Metropolitan Borough of Sefton
Crosby, Merseyside